Freedom Records may refer to:

Freedom Records, a now-defunct jazz label owned by Arista Records
Freedom (record label), a subsidiary of Liberty Records
Freedom Records (Houston based label), an R&B label